Fairooj Labiba (better known as Labiba) is a Bangladeshi singer and YouTuber. She was crowned as a champion of Gaaner Raja 2019.

Personal life and education 
Labiba was born in Khulna. As of 2019, she was studying at Government Coronation Girls High School. Her elder sister Fairooj Maliha is also a singer.

Career 
Labiba started to learn singing when she was two years old. In 2019, she participated in Gaaner Raja and became champion. Labiba's first original song, "Keno Eto Chai Toke", was released on 5 November 2019. Labiba sang it alongside Imran Mahmudul. The song was written by Robiul Islam Jibon and was composed by Imran. The song has over 25 million views on YouTube.

Awards and nominations
 Champion of Gaaner Raja 2019.

References

External links
 

21st-century Bangladeshi women singers
21st-century Bangladeshi singers
People from Khulna District
People from Khulna
Living people
2009 births
Child singers